Guandong is a town in Congjiang County, Guizhou, China. It is located in the northeast of the county, to the west of the 202 Provincial Road.

Towns in Guizhou
Congjiang County